The Trans-Fly – Bulaka River  South-Central Papuan languages form a hypothetical family of Papuan languages. They include many of the languages west of the Fly River in southern Papua New Guinea into southern Indonesian West Papua, plus a pair of languages on the Bulaka River a hundred km further west.

The family was posited by Stephen Wurm as a branch of his 1975 Trans–New Guinea proposal. Wurm thought it likely that many of these languages would prove to not actually belong to Trans–New Guinea, but rather to have been heavily influenced by Trans–New Guinea languages. Malcolm Ross (2005) concurred, and removed most of them.

Classification
None of the families are closely related; indeed, it is difficult to demonstrate a link between any of them. Wurm's 1975 TNG branch included the following eight demonstrated families:
Kiwaian, on the banks and east of the Fly River
Waia, north of the Fly delta
Tirio, on the western bank of the Fly River
Eastern Trans-Fly languages, south of the Fly delta
Pahoturi, west of the Eastern languages
Yam, up to and just across the Indonesian border
Moraori, between Upper Maro and the Marind language
Bulaka River, west of Marind

Ross (2005) accepted the TNG identity of Tirio, Moraori, and, tentatively, Kiwaian. He split off the four Eastern Trans-Fly languages as an independent family. The remainder of the family, which he calls South-Central Papuan, is only tentatively retained: their pronouns are suggestive of a relationship, but this has not been demonstrated.

A more conservative approach would break up Wurm's Trans-Fly – Bulaka River entirely, with two or three of the families remaining within Trans–New Guinea, and five or six being independent.  Evans (2012), for example, argues that the inclusion of the Yam language at least is not justified on present evidence. Timothy Usher treats the Bulaka River and Yam languages as separate families, and links the Pahoturi– clade to the Eastern Trans-Fly languages.

Southern New Guinea linguistic area
A Southern New Guinea linguistic area, which spans both Indonesia and Papua New Guinea, consisting of the following families is mentioned in Evans (2018).

Yelmek-Maklew - 500 speakers
Yam (Morehead-Upper Maro) - 3,000 speakers
Pahoturi River - just over 4,000 speakers
Oriomo (Eastern Trans-Fly) - 6,500 speakers
Trans-New Guinea (TNG)
Kolopom - just over 7,000 speakers
Marori - fewer than 20 elderly speakers
Gogodala-Suki - 30,000 speakers
Kiwaian - 37,000 speakers
Anim
Marindic - 10,000 speakers
Tirio (Lower Fly)
Ipiko (Inland Gulf)

Languages within the Southern New Guinea linguistic area generally share these typological features.
lack of tone (except Kuni-Boazi, possibly Marind, and some Kiwai dialects)
complex verb morphology
limited or no gender (except for the four-way gender system in Anim languages, and the masculine vs. feminine contrast on undergoer-prefixes in the Tonda languages and some Oriomo languages)
lack of verb chaining or switch-reference
single-word verbs form an open class

Pronouns
The pronouns Ross reconstructs for the three families he keeps together are suggestively similar, but it has not been possible to reconstruct common forms:

Proto-Yam (Proto–Morehead – Upper Maro)
{| class=wikitable
|-
| I/we||*ni
|-
| you||*bu
|-
| s/he/they||*be
|}

Proto-Pahoturi
{| class=wikitable
|-
| I||*ŋa-na||we||?
|-
| thou||*ba or *be||you||*-bi
|-
| s/he||*bo||they||?
|}

Proto–Bulaka River
{| class=wikitable
|-
| I||*ŋöl||we||*ŋag
|-
| thou||*ob||you||*el
|-
| s/he||*ib||they||*im
|}

Lexical comparison
The lexical data below is from the Trans-New Guinea database and Usher (2020) (for Proto-Kiwai), unless noted otherwise. Neighboring languages not traditionally classified within Trans-Fly–Bulaka River are also included for comparison.

See also
Trans-Fly languages

References

External links
South-Central Papuan languages database at TransNewGuinea.org
 Bulaka River on newguineaworld

 
Proposed language families
Papuan languages